The following Union Army units and commanders fought in the Second Battle of Petersburg (June 15–18, 1864) of the American Civil War. Order of battle compiled from the casualty returns. The Confederate order of battle is listed separately.

Abbreviations used

Military Rank
 LTG = Lieutenant General
 MG = Major General
 BG = Brigadier General
 Col = Colonel
 Ltc = Lieutenant Colonel
 Maj = Major
 Cpt = Captain

Other
 w = wounded
 k = killed

General in Chief

LTG Ulysses S. Grant, commanding general, U.S. armies

Army of the James

MG Benjamin F. Butler

Headquarters units
Naval Brigade

BG Charles K. Graham

Siege Artillery

Col Henry L. Abbot
 1st Connecticut Heavy Artillery
 13th New York Heavy Artillery, Companies A and H
 3rd Pennsylvania Heavy Artillery, Company M

X Corps

BG Alfred H. Terry

XVIII Corps

MG William F. Smith

Cavalry

Army of the Potomac

MG George Meade

Headquarters units
Provost Guard

BG Marsena R. Patrick
 1st Massachusetts Cavalry, Companies C & D
 80th New York
 3rd Pennsylvania Cavalry
 68th Pennsylvania
 114th Pennsylvania

Artillery

BG Henry J. Hunt

Volunteer Engineer Brigade

BG Henry W. Benham
 15th New York Engineers
 50th New York Engineers
 Battalion U.S. Engineers

II Corps

MG Winfield S. Hancock relinquished command June 18
MG David B. Birney
 1st Vermont Cavalry, Company M

V Corps

MG Gouverneur K. Warren
 12th New York Battalion

VI Corps

MG Horatio G. Wright
 8th Pennsylvania Cavalry, Company A

IX Corps

MG Ambrose E. Burnside
 8th United States

Cavalry Corps

MG Philip H. Sheridan

Notes

References
 U.S. War Department, The War of the Rebellion: a Compilation of the Official Records of the Union and Confederate Armies, U.S. Government Printing Office, 1880–1901.
 Eicher, John H., and Eicher, David J., Civil War High Commands, Stanford University Press, 2001, .

American Civil War orders of battle